Orsatti is a surname. Notable people with the surname include:

 Andrew Orsatti (born 1975), Communications Director and Spokesman for football's international players' union FIFPro
 Ernie Orsatti (1902–1968), American baseballer
 Ken Orsatti (1932–2010), American film director
 Victor Orsatti (1905–1984), American talent agent and film producer

Italian-language surnames